The 2009 Mexican League season was the 85th season in the history of the Mexican League. It was contested by 16 teams, evenly divided in North and South zones. The season started on 24 March with the match between 2008 season champions Diablos Rojos del México and Sultanes de Monterrey and ended on 29 August with the last game of the Serie del Rey, where Saraperos de Saltillo defeated Tigres de Quintana Roo to win the championship.

Due to the swine flu pandemic, the league decided to play the matches between 28 and 30 April behind closed doors and suspended all the series from 1 to 5 May.

Standings

Postseason

League leaders

Awards

References

Mexican League season
Mexican League season
Mexican League seasons